The 2021 Sukma-Bijapur attack was an ambush carried out by the Naxalite-Maoist insurgents from the Communist Party of India (Maoist) against Indian security forces on 3 April 2021 at Sukma-Bijapur border near Jonaguda village which falls under Jagargunda police station area in Sukma district of Chhattisgarh, leading to the killing of 22 security personnel and 9 Naxalites. The death toll was the worst for Indian security forces fighting the Naxalites since 2017.

On 2 April 2021, separate joint teams of security forces launched a major anti-Maoist operation from Bijapur and Sukma district in the South Bastar forests.

Background 
On 23 March 2021, five District Reserve Guard (DRG) personnel were killed and 13 others injured when Maoists blew up a bus carrying the security personnel with an Improvised explosive device in Narayanpur district of Chhattisgarh. The Maoists' group was aided by insurgents associated with the Maoist platoons of Pamed, Konta, Jagargunda, and Basaguda area committees with them nearly 250 in strength.

Security forces had launched an operation after the presence of wanted Maoist leader Hidma in the area. Hidma, a tribal from Puvarti village of Sukma district, who heads the People's Liberation Guerrilla Army’s (PLGA) battalion number 1, is known for deadly ambushes. He joined hands with the rebels in the 1990s and leads around 180 to 250 Maoist fighters, including women. A charge sheet has been filed against Hidma in the 2019 BJP MLA Bhima Mandavi murder case by the NIA. Hidma is accused in at least 26 attacks, including the 2013 Jhiram Ghati massacre of frontline Congress leaders and Burkapal ambush of April 2017 in which 24 CRPF personnel were killed.

Attack 
On 3 April 2021, the security personnel belonging to the Central Reserve Police Force’s elite CoBRA unit, the District Reserve Guard, and the Special Task Force were ambushed in the tribal-dominated central Indian state of Chhattisgarh during an anti-insurgency operation. The fighting ensued when Indian security forces, acting on military intelligence, raided a rebel hideout in a densely forested area of Bijapur district.

At least 22 Indian security personnel were killed and 30 injured in the ambush by Maoist rebels that lasted for four hours in the border Sukma district, 540km (340 miles) south of state-capital Raipur. The insurgents, who had also suffered casualties, had managed to seize the dead soldiers’ weapons. Later, a combing operation to locate one missing soldier was conducted. According to Bhupesh Baghel, chief minister of Chhattisgarh, the gun battle in the state's Bastar division saw the use of "bullets, grenades and rocket launchers" from both sides.

Uddipan Mukherjee, a joint director for the government owned Ordnance Factory Board, said the pandemic had allowed the rebels to recruit more members.
Mukherjee has been tracking war strategy of the Maoists for over a decade. His thesis was agreed upon by others who had access to direct knowledge of the situation.

Reactions

Domestic
Ram Nath Kovind, the President of India expressed deep anguish over the martyrdom of security personnel. Prime minister Narendra Modi and CM of Chhattisgarh Bhupesh Baghel condemned the incident. The Union Home Minister Amit Shah said, "Befitting reply to Chattisgarh Naxal attack will be given at appropriate time."

International
Foreign Ministry of Turkey condemns the attack and "sends consolidates to those soldiers who were martyred in 'heinous' attack by terrorists".

See also
 April 2010 Maoist attack in Dantewada
 2013 Naxal attack in Darbha valley
 2017 Sukma attack
 2018 Sukma attack

References

2021 mass shootings in Asia
21st century in Chhattisgarh
21st-century mass murder in India
April 2021 crimes in Asia
Bijapur district, Chhattisgarh
Communist Party of India (Maoist)
Explosions in 2021
Explosions in India
Grenade attacks
Mass murder in 2021
Mass shootings in India
Murder in Chhattisgarh
Naxalite–Maoist insurgency
2021 Bijapur attack
Terrorist incidents in India in 2021
Terrorist incidents in Chhattisgarh
2021 murders in India